Reeders Run is a stream in the U.S. state of Ohio. It is a tributary to Turtle Creek.

Reeders Run was named after David Reeder, an early settler who purchased the site in 1797.

References

Rivers of Warren County, Ohio
Rivers of Ohio